The Weaker(?) Sex is a Canadian talk show television series which aired on CBC Television from 1968 to 1969.

Premise
British presenter Pamela Mason hosted the initial 13-week run of this series in which she interviewed male guests with one exception (Judy LaMarsh). She was sometimes accompanied by Jim Fleming, a broadcaster who later became a federal cabinet minister. These episodes were coproductions between the CBC in Toronto and Krantz Films in New York. The series was broadcast on CBC in Canada and syndicated to American stations.

For the following three months, episodes were entirely produced by the CBC. Lorraine Thomson replaced Mason as host and interview subjects included more women. The first episode under this mid-season modification featured the topic "Why Women Dislike Men" with guests Barbara Hamilton and her sister Mary McInnis.

Scheduling
This half-hour series was broadcast on weekdays at 4:00 p.m. (Eastern) from 30 September to 30 December 1968, then weekdays at 2:00 p.m. from 6 January to 31 March 1969.

References

External links
 
 

CBC Television original programming
1968 Canadian television series debuts
1969 Canadian television series endings
1960s Canadian television talk shows